Koyukuk may refer to:
 Koyukuk, Alaska
 Koyukuk River
 Koyukuk National Wildlife Refuge